The twelfth general convention of the Nepali Congress party was held in Kathmandu from September 17–21, 2010. Elections were held for the posts of President, General Secretary and Treasurer. The convention also elected 61 members to the party's Central Working Committee (CWC). 14th General Convention will be held in Bhadra of 2078.

Election results 

President 

General Secretary 

Treasurer 

Central Working Committee (CWC) Members

Elections to the 61 CWC seats were held in three categories : 25 seats were contested under the open category, 14 seats under the zonal category and 22 seats under reserved quotas for  women, Dalit, Madeshi, Muslim and  Janajati  categories. 

Elected in open category:

Elected in zonal category:

Elected in Janajati, Women, Dalit, Madhesi and Muslim category:

References 

Internal elections of political parties in Nepal